Iliana Raycheva Raeva-Sirakova (born 15 March 1963) is a Bulgarian gymnast who competed in modern rhythmic gymnastics for her country from 1978 to 1982. She was one of the Golden Girls of Bulgaria that dominated Rhythmic Gymnastics in 1980s.

Biography

She was born on 15 March 1963 in Sofia, Bulgaria. She was raised in Sofia, on the same street as fellow gymnasts Lilia Ignatova and Anelia Ralenkova, who also competed for the same Levski gymnastics club. Iliana was the recognized leader, both in their street games and in the team, who started learning gymnastics ABC under the clever and experienced eyes of the coach Zlatka Bontcheva in "Levski-Spartak " club, Sofia. At 15 Iliana went on to train under Neshka Robeva who had joined the club shortly before.

She placed sixth at her first European Championships in 1978 at the age of 16, and was 4th in the all round competition at the World Rhythmic Gymnastics Championships where she won the gold medal for clubs, and the silver for ball.  Raeva won her first all around gold at the 1980 Julieta Shishmanova Cup, and went on to dominate the European Championships in Amsterdam, winning the all around gold medal, gold for rope, hoop and clubs, and placing silver with the ribbon.

Iliana's first "great day" was in London, at the 1979 World Championships, when she shared the gold for the clubs routine together with the AA champion Irina Deriugina of (USSR) and Daniella Boshanska (CZE). One year later, at the  1980 European Championships in Amsterdam, Raeva swept the gold in the all around, rope, hoop and clubs.

She claimed all around silver at the 1981 World Championships, and tied with teammate Ignatova for the silver, one tenth of a point behind the winner Ralenkova.   She won silver for hoop and ribbon, and bronze for the rope.  She was third at the 1982 European Championships, picking up bronze in each apparatus final.

She relied on style and artistry, rather than excessively complex moves, with her 1980 ribbon routine to Zorba the Greek and clubs routine to Tchaikovsky's Swan Lake, which remain outstanding examples of the sport.

After retiring from active competition she married Bulgarian World Cup footballer Nasko Sirakov, and now runs her own gymnastics club "Iliana" in Bulgaria.  In 1999, she became the Head of the Council of Coaches in the Bulgarian Rhythmic Gymnastics Federation. She led the Bulgarian team in the 2000 Olympic Games in Sydney. She was the coach of the Bulgarian Group, which won the bronze medal in the 2004 Summer Olympics in Athens.

References

External links
 
 NSA Bulgarian gymnasts

1963 births
Living people
Bulgarian rhythmic gymnasts
Gymnasts from Sofia
Association footballers' wives and girlfriends
Medalists at the Rhythmic Gymnastics World Championships